Mexican governors of New Mexico were the political chief executives of the province and later territory of Santa Fe de Nuevo México (New Mexico) between 1822, when Mexico gained independence from Spain, and 1846, when the United States occupied the territory following the Mexican–American War. It was succeeded as a territory of the United States, and as the U.S. state of New Mexico.

History
In January 1822 the last Governor under the Spanish regime, Facundo Melgares, lost the title of governor and was now called géfe político (political chief) and géfe militar (military chief). Melgáres left the political office on July 5, 1822, and Francisco Xavier Chavez took his place, holding office for just five months, when he was succeeded in November 1822 by Colonel José Antonio Vizcarra. Vizcarra had succeeded Melgáres as géfe militar in October 1822.
In September 1823, a retired Militia Captain named Don Bartolomé Baca was appointed géfe politico. Eleven more men were to serve as either géfe político or governor before the occupation of New Mexico in 1846 by the United States Army during the Mexican–American War.

New Mexico was at first a province of the Estado interno del Norte, with capital in Chihuahua. As of July 6, 1824, New Mexico was made a separate territory, with El Paso del Norte (now called Ciudad Juárez) transferred from New Mexico to the State of Chihuahua.

Political chiefs and governors

The political chiefs (géfe políticos) or governors were:

See also

History of New Mexico
List of Spanish governors of New Mexico (1598–1822)
List of U.S. governors of New Mexico (1846–present)

References
Citations

Sources

+
Governors,Mexican

New Mexico-related lists